Kaatrin Mozhi is a Tamil language drama airing on Star Vijay. It premiered on 7 October 2019 and ended on 9 April 2021 for 331 episodes. The show stars Priyanka m Jain and
Sanjeev, Manoharan. It is an official remake of Telugu serial Mounaraagam which airs in Star Maa. Priyanka M Jain reprises her role in both versions.

Plot
This is about a girl named Kanmani who has been rejected by her father all her life. Her father Subbu makes her mother Rajeshwari take poison while pregnant because he feels that he cannot afford to pay for another daughter. As a result, Kanmani is being born mute. Kanmani does all the household works and also goes house to house selling milk. Consequently, she meets a city boy called Santhosh who will be following her daily and remembers her as the child who saved him from a car crash in his childhood. Kanmani only longs for the affection of her cold and distant father and is oblivious to the love bestowed on her by Santhosh.

Cast

Main 
 Priyanka Jain as Kanmani, Subbu and Rajeshwari's daughter, Aishwarya and Raja's sister 
 Ahana Sharma as Young Kanmani (2019)
 Manoharan Krishnan as Subburaj "Subbu", Kanmani’s father
 Sanjeev as Santhosh, Kalyani's son, Priya's brother, Deepika's cousin 
Vikram Siva as Shiva

Recurring 
 Anila Sreekumar / Sripriya as Rajeshwari, Subbu's wife, Kanmani, Raja and Aishwarya's mother   
 Swapna Tresa /Premi Venkat as Kalyani, Santhosh and Priya's mother, Raja's mother-in-law, Deepika's aunt, Venkatesh's sister.
 Priyanka as Priya, Santosh’s sister, Raja’s wife
 Sunitha as Aishwarya, Kanmani's elder sister, Rajesh's Wife
 Durairamachandran Suresh as Rajeshekaran "Rajesh", Aishwarya’s husband
Lokesh as Raja , Kanmani’s brother , Priya’s husband 
Srilekha Rajendran as Ganthimathi , Subbu's mother, Kanmani's grandmother
 Androos Jesdas as Venkatesh, Kalyani's brother
 Akila /Dharani as Akhila Venkatesh, Venkatesh's wife, Deepika’s mother
Chandini Prakash as Deepika , Venkatesh's daughter , Santhosh’s cousin and Santhosh Obeassive lover 
 Guru Aravind as Maaran, Santhosh’s cousin brother , a police officer
 Ashok as Guru Moorthy , Kalyani brother in law , Maaran father 
 Vaishnavi Rajasekaran as Rosy, Kanmani's best friend
 Sai Gopi as Selvam, Kanmani’s uncle
 Yogi as Chidambaram

Adaptations

References

External links
 

Star Vijay original programming
Tamil-language romance television series
2019 Tamil-language television series debuts
Tamil-language television shows
2021 Tamil-language television series endings
Tamil-language television series based on Telugu-language television series